Ch'in Chia (Chinese: 秦嘉; courtesy name: Shih-hui) also known as Qin Jia (c. first century B.C. – first century A.D.) was a Chinese poet of the Eastern Han dynasty.

Name 

The word "Ch'in Chia" means all relations who bear a different family name.

Life 

Ch'in Chia came from Lunghsi. He lived during the Eastern Han dynasty, and was a civil servant.

Separation from his wife 

He was married to Hsu Shu, who was also a poet. They had a very harmonious relationship.

When Ch'in Chia was promoted to the post of commandery supervisor at the capital (Luoyang), and summoned to take up an appointment there, his wife fell ill and had to stay at home with her parents. He was therefore unable to say goodbye to her personally, and sent her a series of three poems instead, entitled "Poems for My Wife".

Hsu Shu, in her turn, responded by sending him poems of her own, maintaining a loving correspondence, of which the following is a sample:

Poetry 

Ch'in Chia's first poem to his wife expresses his sorrow at their separation, and longing for reunion:

Legacy and influence 

A 1968 edition of China Today explains that "Ch'in Chia and his wife Hsui Shu are supposed to be a couple of constant and profound lovers and therefore have often been referred to as such in subsequent ages by people when they laud wedded bliss."

Anne Birrell, in Games Poets Play, stated: "Ch'in Chia's expression of helpless melancholy and graceful, gallant compliments influenced the development of poems on conjugal love."

References 

1st-century BC births
1st-century deaths
1st-century BC writers
1st-century writers
Han dynasty poets
Poets from Gansu